Johan Eurén (born 18 May 1985) is a Swedish wrestler who won a bronze medal at the 2012 Summer Olympics in the Greco-Roman 120 kg category.

References

External links
 

Swedish male sport wrestlers
1985 births
Living people
Olympic wrestlers of Sweden
Wrestlers at the 2012 Summer Olympics
Wrestlers at the 2016 Summer Olympics
Olympic bronze medalists for Sweden
Olympic medalists in wrestling
Medalists at the 2012 Summer Olympics
World Wrestling Championships medalists
European Wrestling Championships medalists
20th-century Swedish people
21st-century Swedish people